The Cyclopedia of Universal History was an encyclopedia of then known world history (universal history) authored by John Clark Ridpath. The book was produced, initially in 3 volumes, from 1880 to 1884 and was copiously illustrated in black and white, and then expanded to four volumes in 1890 to include a comprehensive account of the events of the nineteenth century up to that time. It also became the prototype for his later History of the World (8 volumes, 1894) and Universal History (16 volumes, 1895).  The latter comprises his four-volume work, Great Races of Mankind (1894), which was dedicated to his wife, and was his last major work, having devoted ten years researching and four years writing.

Notes

External links

The following volumes are from Ridpath's later edition of Cyclopedia of Universal History with missing volumes made up from the closely related Universal History:

1880 non-fiction books
English-language encyclopedias
American encyclopedias
Reference works in the public domain